Ankara Üniversitesi Spor Kulübü, is an amateur Korfball club from Ankara, Turkey. In 2011 the club won the Turkish title by beating Kocaeli Üniversitesi 14-13.

Squad (Current)

Player / Head coach    

   Ferda Gürsel

Honours

 2011 - Turkish Champion (1 time)

External links
Turkey Korfball

Korfball teams
Korfball in Turkey
Ankara University